The Lost Mile is the seventh studio album by Vertical Horizon. The album was released exclusively on digital platforms on February 23, 2018. It was released by Outfall Records, the independent label headed by frontman Matt Scannell.

Background and recording

In an interview with Billboard Magazine, Scannell describes The Lost Mile as "the most indulgent album I've ever made." The album marks somewhat of a departure from the band's established sound, both in terms of its focus on keyboards and in relation to the length of the songs - of which only one runs for less than four minutes. Scannell cited bands such as Depeche Mode, The Cure and New Order as influences, as well as the Cormac McCarthy novel No Country for Old Men. The album features a re-recording of "I'm Not Running," a song that was originally co-written and performed with American singer-songwriter Richard Marx. Marx provides backing vocals on the studio version of the song. The first single, "I'm Gonna Save You," was released on February 14.

Track listing
All songs were written by Matt Scannell, except where noted.

Personnel
Vertical Horizon
 Matt Scannell - vocals, guitars, keyboards, production, engineering, photography
 Sean Hurley - bass
 Ron LaVella - drums

Additional personnel
 Richard Marx - backing vocals 
 Joel Numa, Tom Weir – engineering
 Ben Grosse, Paul Pavao – mixing
 Ted Jensen – mastering
 Craig M. Renwick – photography
 Justin Wolfe – cover art

References

2018 albums
Vertical Horizon albums